Mibu no Udamaro (壬生宇太麿 or 壬生宇太麻呂) was a Japanese nobleman and waka poet in the Nara period.

Biography 
Mibu no Udamaro, a nobleman and waka poet, was active in the Nara period. His name, Udamaro is variously written 宇太麿, 宇陁麿, 宇太麻呂, 宇多麻呂, 宇陁麻呂, 宇陀麻呂, or 宇太万呂. His kabane was Omi (使主). His birth and death years are unknown.

One early document records that in the sixth year of Tenpyō (734) he was sent to Izumo Province as a lesser secretary (少外記 shō-geki) and scribe of government documents (公文使録事) in service of the kuni no miyatsuko, when he was of the Senior Seventh Rank, Upper Grade and held the 12th Class in the order of merit (勲十二等). The Man'yōshū indicates that two years later, in the second month of Tenpyō 8, he was dispatched to Silla as a Senior Magistrate (大判官), at which time he was of the Junior Sixth Rank, Upper Grade. The position of Senior Magistrate was third in importance, surpassed only by Ambassador (大使) and Vice-Ambassador (副使). On the way to Silla, his ship made stop-offs at such places as Nagai-no-ura (長井浦) in Higo Province, Kara-no-tomari (韓亭) and Hikitsu-no-tomari (引津亭) in Chikuzen Province, and Takeshiki-no-ura (竹敷浦) in Tsushima, where he composed his poetry. In the first month of the following year, he returned to Japan.

In the fourth month of Tenpyō 10 he was made vice-governor (介 suke) of Kōzuke Province. and in the fourth month of Tenpyō 18 he was made Vice-Governor of the Right (右京亮 ukyō-no-suke). In the fifth month of Tenpyō Shōhō 2 he was made governor of Tajima Province.

Poetry 
Poems 3612, 3669, 3674, 3675 and 3702 in the Man'yōshū (Book XV) are attributed to Udamaro. Of these five poems, four are tanka and one is a sedōka. The poems he composed on his way to Silla are all straightforward expressions of the mood of the journey.

Notes

References

Citations

Works cited 

 
 
 
 

8th-century Japanese poets
Man'yō poets
Japanese male poets
Kuge